Goose Creek is a  long tributary of the Snake River. It is impounded by Oakley Dam several miles south of Oakley, Idaho, forming Lower Goose Creek Reservoir. All of the creek's water is stored for irrigation, so its channel from the reservoir to its mouth near Burley, Idaho, is dry and largely obliterated by agriculture. Goose Creek has a  watershed. The California Trail followed Goose Creek from a point just north of the Idaho/Utah border southwest across northwestern Utah to Little Goose Creek in northeastern Elko County, Nevada.

The stream was named for the geese along its course.

See also
List of rivers of Idaho
List of longest streams of Idaho
List of rivers of Nevada
List of rivers of Utah

References

External links

Rivers of Cassia County, Idaho
Rivers of Elko County, Nevada
Rivers of Box Elder County, Utah
Rivers of Idaho
Rivers of Nevada
Rivers of Utah
Tributaries of the Snake River